The 1970 Colorado Buffaloes football team represented the University of Colorado in the Big Eight Conference during the 1970 NCAA University Division football season. Led by eighth-year head coach Eddie Crowder, the Buffaloes were 6–4 in the regular season (3–4 in Big 8, fourth), and played their home games on campus at Folsom Field in Boulder, Colorado.

In a nationally televised game on ABC, #18 Colorado upset fourth-ranked Penn State 41–13 in Boulder in late September, breaking a 23-game winning (and 31-game undefeated) streak. The Buffaloes moved up to eighth in the AP poll, but were upset the next week by a point at Kansas State, led by quarterback Lynn Dickey.

Invited to the Liberty Bowl in Memphis, Tennessee, the #19 Buffaloes were upset by Tulane to finish at 6–5.

In December, CU defensive coordinator Don James became the head coach at Kent State in Ohio; four years later he was hired at Washington in Seattle. He led the Huskies for eighteen seasons, including a shared national championship in 1991.

Schedule

Roster

References

External links
University of Colorado Athletics – 1970 football roster
Sports Reference – 1970 Colorado football season

Colorado
Colorado Buffaloes football seasons
Colorado Buffaloes football